The Pârâul Florilor is a small river in Cluj County, western Romania. It is a left tributary of the river Arieș. It flows through the villages of  Boj-Cătun, Valea Florilor and Ploscoș, and joins the Arieș opposite Câmpia Turzii. A reach of the Câmpia Turzii - Cluj railway follows the course of the Pârâul Florilor.

References

Rivers of Romania
Rivers of Cluj County